Bissandugu is a city in southwestern Guinea on national road nb 1. In the nineteenth century, it was the base for Samori Ture, a Dyula warlord who named the city in 1878 as the capital of his Wassoulou Empire (1861-1890). Ture was known for his resistance to French colonial forces and prevailed against them and smaller African states for years.

The treaty of Bissandugu was signed there on the 25th of March 1887, by which France would obtain major rights of navigation on the Niger river, an important prelude to its conquests of West Africa, and delimiting the Wassoulou empire's borders with France. Furthermore, the treaty made the Wassoulou empire a French protectorate.

On April 9, 1891, the city was attacked and burned by French forces commanded by Colonel Louis Archinard during the Mandingo Wars. The French colonial administration re-established control in the area. Traces of the ancient fortifications of the city can still be found just outside the modern-day village.

After Guinea attained independence, Ture's great-grandson, Ahmed Sékou Touré, was elected as its first president.

References

History of Guinea
Populated places in Guinea
French West Africa
Archaeology of Guinea